Erin McGowan (born 9 February 1981) is an Australian lightweight world champion boxer and model.

Championships and awards

Boxing
World Boxing Organization World lightweight title
Women's International Boxing Association World lightweight title

Professional boxing record

References

External links
 

1981 births
Living people
Sportspeople from Perth, Western Australia
Australian women boxers
World lightweight boxing champions
Sportswomen from Western Australia
World Boxing Organization champions
20th-century Australian women
21st-century Australian women